is a Japanese Olympic show jumping rider. He competed at the 2016 Summer Olympics in Rio de Janeiro, Brazil, where he finished 13th in the team and was eliminated in the first round of the individual competition.

Fukushima participated at the 2010 World Equestrian Games and the 2006 Asian Games.

References

External links
 
 

1977 births
Living people
People from Sakura, Chiba
Sportspeople from Chiba Prefecture
Japanese male equestrians
Show jumping riders
Equestrians at the 2016 Summer Olympics
Olympic equestrians of Japan
Equestrians at the 2006 Asian Games
Equestrians at the 2018 Asian Games
Asian Games silver medalists for Japan
Asian Games medalists in equestrian
Medalists at the 2018 Asian Games
Equestrians at the 2020 Summer Olympics